The Yberg is a mountain of Baden-Württemberg, Germany. Surrounding places include Baden-Baden, Geroldsau, Sinzheim, Steinbach, and Varnhalt.

Yburg Castle is situated at the summit of the mountain.

Mountains and hills of Baden-Württemberg
Mountains and hills of the Black Forest